Thiohalocapsa marina is a Gram-negative, spherical-shaped, phototrophic and non-motile bacterium from the genus of Thiohalocapsa which has been isolated from a marine aquaculture pond from Visakhapatnam in India.

References 

Chromatiales
Bacteria described in 2009